The 1976 Temple Owls football team was an American football team that represented Temple University as an independent during the 1976 NCAA Division I football season. In its seventh season under head coach Wayne Hardin, the team compiled a 4–6 record and was outscored by a total of 216 to 196. The team played its home games at Veterans Stadium (three games) and Franklin Field (two games) in Philadelphia. 

The team's statistical leaders included Pat Carey with 839 passing yards, Anthony Anderson with 803 rushing yards, and Ken Williams with 580 receiving yards and 36 points scored.

Schedule

References

Temple
Temple Owls football seasons
Temple Owls football